Franz Schubert's Works: Complete and Authoritative Edition, also known as the Collected Edition, is a late 19th-century publication of Franz Schubert's compositions. The publication is also known as the Alte Gesamt-Ausgabe ("the former complete edition"), abbreviated as AGA, for instance in the 1978 edition of the Deutsch catalogue, in order to distinguish it from the New Schubert Edition.

Publication
The twenty-two series (some in several volumes) were published from 1884 to 1897 by Breitkopf & Härtel. Eusebius Mandyczewski was one of the main editors. From 1965 Dover Publications started to reprint this edition, and later it was made available at the IMSLP website.

Content

I. Symphonien (Nos. 1-8)
Editor: Johannes Brahms. Issued 1884. Two volumes (Symphonies 1–3; Symphonies 4–6/8–9). Reprinted: Dover Publications, 1978.

II. Overtüren und Andere Orchesterwerke
Editor: Johann Nepomuk Fuchs. Issued 1886. Partially reprinted (Nos.1-7) as Overtures "In the Italian style" and Other Works by Dover Publications, 2002.

III. Oktette (Nos. 1-3)
Editor: Eusebius Mandyczewski, Issued 1889.

IV. Streichquintett
Editor: Eusebius Mandyczewski. Issued 1889.

V. Streichquartette (Nos. 1-15)
Editors: Joseph Hellmesberger, Eusebius Mandyczewski. Issued 1890.

VI. Trio für Streichinstrumente
Editor: Eusebius Mandyczewski, 1892.

VII. Trios, Quartets and Quintets with Piano
Editor: Ignaz Brüll, 1886. Two volumes.

VIII. Pianoforte und Ein Instrument, Partitur und Stimmen
Editor: Ignaz Brüll, 1886.

IX. Pianoforte zu vier Händen (F.S. 61-92)
Editor: Anton Door, 1888. Three volumes.

X. Sonaten für Pianoforte
Editor: Julius Epstein. Issued 1888

XI. Fantasie, Impromptus und andere Stücke für Pianoforte (Nos. 1-16)
Editor: Julius Epstein, 1
888.

XII. Tänze für Pianoforte (Nos. 1-31)
Editor: Julius Epstein, 1889.

XIII. Messen (Nos. 1-7)
Editor: Eusebius Mandyczewski, 1887. Two volumes: Mass 1–4, and Mass 5–6 with the Deutsche Messe.

XIV. Kleinere Kirchenmusikwerke (Nos. 1-22)
Editor: Eusebius Mandyczewski; Issued 1888.

XV. Dramatische Musik
Editor: Johann Nepomuk Fuchs, 1893. Seven volumes.

XVI. Werke für Männerchor (Nos. 1-46)
Editor: Eusebius Mandyczewski. Issued 1891.

XVII. Werke für gemischten Chor (Nos. 1-19)
Editors: Josef Gänsbacher, Eusebius Mandyczewski. Issued 1892.

XVIII. Werke für Drei und mehr Frauenstimmen mit Pianoforte-Begleitung (Nos. 1-6)
Editors: Josef Gänsbacher, Eusebius Mandyczewski, 1891.

XIX. Kleine Gesangswerke (Nos. 1-36)
Editors: Josef Gänsbacher, Eusebius Mandyczewski, 1892.

XX. Sämtliche einstimmige Lieder und Gesänge 
Editor: Eusebius Mandyczewski, 1894–1895. Ten volumes.

XXI. Supplement: Instrumentalmusik; Gesangsmusik
Editor: Eusebius Mandyczewski, 349p., 1897.
Volume 1–3: Instrumentalmusik.
Volume 4: Gesangsmusik

XXII. Revisionsbericht
Twelve volumes.

References

Sources
 Otto Erich Deutsch in collaboration with Donald R. Wakeling. The Schubert Thematic Catalogue. W. W. Norton, 1951. Reprint by Dover Publications, 1995.  
 Otto Erich Deutsch, with revisions by Werner Aderhold and others. Franz Schubert, thematisches Verzeichnis seiner Werke in chronologischer Folge (New Schubert Edition Series VIII Supplement, Volume 4). Kassel: Bärenreiter, 1978. ISMN 9790006305148 —

External links
 

 Franz Schubert's Works
Schubert